Ragnar Klavan (born 30 October 1985) is an Estonian professional footballer who plays as a defender. A left-footed centre back, he has also played as a left back during his career.

Klavan played for Elva, Tulevik and Flora in Estonia, winning the Meistriliiga with Flora in the 2003 season, before moving to the Netherlands where he represented Heracles Almelo and AZ, winning the Eredivisie with the latter in the 2008–09 season. In 2012, he transferred to FC Augsburg and spent four seasons in the Bundesliga before his move to Liverpool in 2016 for €5 million. In 2018, Klavan signed for Serie A's Cagliari in a transfer worth £2 million. In 2021, he returned to Estonia signing for Paide Linnameeskond.

Klavan made his senior international debut for Estonia in 2003, and became captain in 2012. In 2015, he became the ninth player to make 100 appearances for Estonia, and is currently the fifth-most capped player in the history of the national team. Klavan has won the Estonian Footballer of the Year award a record seven times, in 2012 and from 2014 to 2019.

Early life
Klavan was born on 30 October 1985 in Viljandi, Estonia to Tiina and Dzintar Klavan. His father was a professional footballer who played as a midfielder and represented the Estonia national team. Klavan also started playing football as a midfielder; later stating that Zinedine Zidane was his inspiration.

Club career

Tulevik
Klavan started out playing for his hometown team Tulevik. He made his senior league debut in the Esiliiga on 8 April 2001, playing for Tulevik's reserve team Elva and scoring the winning goal against Sillamäe Kalev in a 2–1 home victory. He moved to Tulevik's first team in 2002 and made his debut in the Meistriliiga on 31 March 2002, at age 16, in a goalless draw against Levadia. While at Tulevik, Klavan had a trial with Sunderland, but was not offered a contract.

Flora
In July 2003, Klavan joined Meistriliiga club Flora. He made his debut for the club on 11 July 2003, when he came on as a 67th-minute substitute and scored in the 85th minute of a 4–4 away draw against TVMK. Klavan won the Meistriliiga title in the 2003 season.

Vålerenga (loan)
On 31 August 2004, Klavan joined Norwegian club Vålerenga on a three-month loan for a fee of 300,000 NOK, with an option to sign permanently for €500,000 when the loan period is over. He made his debut in the Tippeligaen on 19 September 2004, coming on as a substitute in the 86th minute of a 4–1 victory over Molde. Klavan made one more league appearance before spending two matches on the bench as an unused substitute. On 19 November 2004, his loan was extended for a year until 30 November 2005.

Heracles Almelo
On 4 August 2005, Klavan signed a three-year contract with Eredivisie club Heracles Almelo for a fee of €200,000. He made his debut in the Eredivisie on 13 August 2005, in a 1–1 home draw against PSV. Klavan scored his first Eredivisie goal on 31 December 2006, in a 2–2 home draw against Vitesse, and provided the assist for Everton's goal in the same match. He scored his second goal on 24 August 2007, in a 2–1 loss to Roda JC. 30 October 2007, Klavan scored in a 3–0 home victory over FC Omniworld in the third round of the KNVB Cup. On 29 December 2007, Klavan signed a new contract that would extend his stay at the club until 30 June 2009. On 20 April 2008, he scored his side's only goal in a 5–1 loss to Ajax in the last match of the 2007–08 season. In the opening match of the 2008–09 season on 31 August 2008, Klavan set-up Darl Douglas' opening goal and scored the second goal in a 3–1 home victory over Feyenoord.

AZ

On 27 January 2009, Klavan joined AZ on loan until the end of the 2008–09 season with an option to sign permanently. He made his debut for the club on 4 February 2009, in a 1–0 home victory over Roda JC when he came on as a 60th-minute substitute for Kees Luijckx. On 14 February, Klavan signed a four-year contract, keeping him with AZ until June 2013. Klavan won the Eredivisie title in the 2008–09 season.

On 29 September 2009, Klavan became the first Estonian to play in the UEFA Champions League group stage when he came on as an 82nd-minute substitute for Sébastien Pocognoli in a 1–1 home draw against Standard Liège. He saw limited playing time under managers Ronald Koeman and Dick Advocaat, making only 11 league appearances in the 2009–10 season, before becoming a regular starter for AZ under Gertjan Verbeek. On 29 July 2010, Klavan scored his first goal for AZ in a 2–0 home win against IFK Göteborg in the third qualifying round of the UEFA Europa League. He scored the third goal in a 3–0 home victory over FC Eindhoven on 10 November 2010, in the fourth round of the KNVB Cup. On 27 October 2011, Klavan scored his side's second goal in the 3–2 extra time win against FC Dordrecht in the third round of the KNVB Cup.

FC Augsburg
On 2 July 2012, Klavan signed a two-year contract with German club FC Augsburg for an undisclosed fee. He made his debut in the Bundesliga on 14 September 2012, when he came on as a 67th-minute substitute for Matthias Ostrzolek in a 0–0 home draw against VfL Wolfsburg. Klavan soon became a first team regular, establishing himself as a first choice centre back alongside Jan-Ingwer Callsen-Bracker. He scored his first Bundesliga goal on 1 March 2014, in a 1–1 home draw against Hannover 96. On 10 May 2014, Klavan scored in a 2–1 home victory over Eintracht Frankfurt.

On 8 February 2015, Klavan scored the opening goal in a 2–2 home draw against Eintracht Frankfurt. Six days later, he scored in a 3–2 away loss to Werder Bremen. Klavan played every minute of the 2014–15 season as FC Augsburg finished fifth in the league, their highest position in history, and qualified for the 2015–16 UEFA Europa League.

Liverpool

On 20 July 2016, Klavan signed a three-year contract with Premier League club Liverpool for a reported fee of £4.2 million (€5 million). The transfer fee of €5 million made him the most expensive Estonian footballer ever. The club confirmed that he would wear the number 17 shirt.

Klavan made his debut in the Premier League on 14 August 2016, in a 4–3 victory over Arsenal at Emirates Stadium. He scored his first goal for Liverpool on 20 September 2016, in a 3–0 away victory over Derby County in the third round of the EFL Cup. On 19 December 2016, Klavan was named man of the match for his performance in Liverpool's 1–0 victory in the derby match against Everton at Goodison Park.

On 1 January 2018, Klavan became the first-ever Estonian player to score in the Premier League when he scored the winning goal in the fourth minute of injury time in a 2–1 away win against Burnley. He made eight appearances in the 2017–18 UEFA Champions League and was an unused substitute in Liverpool's 3–1 loss to Real Madrid in the final of the tournament.

Cagliari
On 17 August 2018, Klavan signed a two-year contract with Italian club Cagliari for a fee of £2 million. He made his debut in the Serie A on 26 August, in a 2–2 home draw against Sassuolo.

Paide Linnameeskond 
On 1 July 2021, Klavan signed for Estonian Meistriliiga club Paide Linnameeskond, returning to Estonia after 17 years abroad. He made his debut for the club in a 2–1 loss against Śląsk Wrocław in the UEFA Europa Conference League qualifying match and his league debut ended 0–0 against the defending champion FC Flora on 31 July. In the next game against Viljandi Tulevik he scored two goals.

International career
Klavan began his youth career in 1999 with the Estonia under-15 team. He also represented the under-17, under-18, under-20, and under-21 national sides, amassing 22 youth appearances overall.

Klavan made his senior international debut for Estonia on 3 July 2003, at age 17, in 5–1 loss to Lithuania at the 2003 Baltic Cup. He scored his first international goal on 31 May 2006, in a 1–1 home draw against New Zealand in a friendly. Klavan made his 50th appearance for the national team on 11 October 2008, in a 3–0 home defeat to Spain in a qualification match for the 2010 FIFA World Cup. He played in both matches against the Republic of Ireland in the UEFA Euro 2012 qualifying play-offs as Estonia lost 5–1 on aggregate.

On 29 February 2012, Klavan captained Estonia for the first time and scored in a 2–0 friendly victory over El Salvador. In 2012, he succeeded Raio Piiroja as Estonia's captain. On 27 March 2015, Klavan made his 100th appearance for Estonia, in a 0–3 away loss to Switzerland in a UEFA Euro 2016 qualifying match. Klavan has been named Estonian Footballer of the Year a record seven times, in 2012, 2014, 2015, 2016, 2017, 2018 and 2019.

Personal life
Klavan and his wife, Lili Orel, married on 10 June 2011. They have two sons: Romer and Ronan.

In May 2016, Klavan became president of Estonian football club Tallinna Kalev.

On 19 December 2020, he tested positive for COVID-19.

Career statistics

Club

International

Scores and results list Estonia's goal tally first, score column indicates score after each Klavan goal.

Honours
Flora
Meistriliiga: 2003

AZ
Eredivisie: 2008–09

Liverpool
UEFA Champions League runner-up: 2017–18

Paide Linnameeskond
Estonian Cup: 2021–22

Individual
Estonian Footballer of the Year: (7) 2012, 2014, 2015, 2016, 2017, 2018, 2019

See also
List of men's footballers with 100 or more international caps

References

External links

1985 births
Living people
Sportspeople from Viljandi
Estonian footballers
Association football defenders
Esiliiga players
FC Elva players
Meistriliiga players
Viljandi JK Tulevik players
FC Flora players
Paide Linnameeskond players
Eliteserien players
Vålerenga Fotball players
Eredivisie players
Heracles Almelo players
AZ Alkmaar players
Bundesliga players
FC Augsburg players
Premier League players
Liverpool F.C. players
Serie A players
Cagliari Calcio players
Estonia youth international footballers
Estonia under-21 international footballers
Estonia international footballers
FIFA Century Club
Estonian expatriate footballers
Estonian expatriate sportspeople in Norway
Expatriate footballers in Norway
Estonian expatriate sportspeople in the Netherlands
Expatriate footballers in the Netherlands
Estonian expatriate sportspeople in Germany
Expatriate footballers in Germany
Estonian expatriate sportspeople in England
Expatriate footballers in England
Estonian expatriate sportspeople in Italy
Expatriate footballers in Italy